Gabrielle Cot is a  portrait oil on canvas painting by William-Adolphe Bouguereau from 1890. Gabrielle Cot was the daughter of the French painter Pierre Auguste Cot, the most notable pupil of  Bouguereau. This painting was one of the only non-commissioned paintings he ever painted.

Background
Initially the work was started as a study for another painting but Bouguereau was enthralled by Gabrielle Cot's charm and beauty, so he decided to paint a portrait of her.

Description
The painting measures  and bears the artist's signature, W-BOUGUEREAU, and the date of 1890 in the lower left corner.

Exhibitions and provenance
The painting was gifted to Madame Duret by Bouguereau  on the occasion
of Gabrielle's marriage. Gabrielle married an architect named Zilin in 1890. The painting was exhibited at the Cercle de L'union Artistique in Paris during 1891. It remained in Duret's family passing down via inheritance until it was sold in New York on 25 May 1983. It was held in a private collection until being sold again in New York on 10 November 1998; it was exhibited a year later in 1999 at the Newington Cropsey Foundation.

References
Citations

Bibliography

External links

Portrait of Gabrielle by William-Adolphe Bouguereau

1890 paintings
Paintings by William-Adolphe Bouguereau
Portraits of women